Rock Creek Butte is a  summit in Baker County, Oregon, in the United States.

Rock Creek Butte is the highest point of the Elkhorn Mountains, and of the greater Blue Mountains, since the Wallowa Mountains are considered separate from the Blue Mountains. At the south slope of the mountain sit two alpine lakes named Twin Lakes while Rock Creek Lake and Bucket Lake lay on the northern slope.

See also
List of mountain peaks of Oregon

References

Mountains of Baker County, Oregon
North American 2000 m summits